The 2015–16 Estonian Cup was the 26th season of the Estonian main domestic football knockout tournament. The cup holders, Nõmme Kalju, were knocked out in the Quarter-Finals by Sillamäe Kalev. Flora won their seventh title after defeating JK Sillamäe Kalev 3–0 in the final.

The winner of the Cup were to qualify for the first qualifying round of the 2016–17 UEFA Europa League, but as Flora were already qualified for the Champions League as 2015 Meistriliiga champions the spot passed to Infonet.

First round
The draw was made by Estonian Football Association on 30 May 2015, on the half time of the 2014–15 final of the same competition.
League level of the club in the brackets.
Rahvaliiga (RL) is a league organized by Estonian Football Association, but not part of the main league system.

Notes
Note 1: Saue JK Laagri withdrew from the competition.

Byes
These teams were not drawn and secured a place in the second round without playing:
 Meistriliiga (Level 1): Nõmme Kalju FC, Tallinna FC Flora, JK Sillamäe Kalev, Pärnu Linnameeskond,
 Esiliiga (2): Tartu FC Santos, Rakvere JK Tarvas
 Esiliiga B (3): Kohtla-Järve JK Järve,
 II Liiga (4):  Tartu JK Welco, Tallinna JK Legion, Viimsi MRJK,
 III Liiga (5): Maardu FC Starbunker II, JK Loo, FC Järva-Jaani, Ambla Vallameeskond, Tallinna SK Dnipro, JK Tallinna Kalev III, Tartu FC Merkuur, FC Otepää, EMÜ SK, Läänemaa JK Haapsalu,
 IV Liiga (6): Tabivere RSK, Tallinna Jalgpalliselts,
 Rahvaliiga (RL): Õismäe Torm, Lootos FCR, JK Fellin

Second round
The draw for the second round was made on 30 June 2015.

Third round
The draw for the third round was made on 13 August 2015.

Fourth round
The draw for the fourth round was made on 1 October 2015.
JK Väätsa Vald, currently playing in the 6th level of Estonian football, is the lowest ranked club remaining.

Quarter-finals
The draw was made on 1 March 2016.

Tallinna FC Forza and Tõrva JK, currently playing in the 4th level of Estonian football, are the lowest ranked clubs remaining.

Semi-finals
The draw was made on 14 April 2016.

Final

See also
 2015 Meistriliiga
 2015 Esiliiga
 2015 Esiliiga B

References

External links
 Official website 

Estonian Cup seasons
Cup
Cup
Estonian